The Finance (No. 2) Act 2005 (c 22) is an Act of the Parliament of the United Kingdom.

Section 2 - Cars: determination of consideration for fuel supplied for private use
The Finance (No.2) Act 2005, Section 2(7), (Appointed Day) Order 2007 (S.I. 2007/946 (C. 38)) was made under section 2(7).

Section 6 - Disclosure of value added tax avoidance schemes
The Finance (No. 2) Act 2005, section 6, (Appointed Day and Savings Provisions) Order 2005 (S.I. 2005/2010 (C. 88)) was made under sections 6(2) and (3).

Section 13 - Corporation tax exemption for organisations
The Finance (No. 2) Act 2005, Section 13 (Corporation Tax Exemption for Scientific Research Organisations) (Appointed Day) Order 2007 (S.I. 2007/3424 (C. 145)) was made under section 13(6).

Section 19 - Section 17: commencement and procedure
The Finance (No. 2) Act 2005, Section 17(1), (Appointed Day) Order 2006 (S.I. 2006/982 (C. 29)) was made under section 19(1).

Section 45 - Lloyd's underwriters: assessment and collection of tax
The Finance (No. 2) Act 2005, Section 45, (Appointed Day) Order 2005 (S.I. 2005/3337 (C. 142)) was made under section 45(9).

Section 48 - Disclosure of information contained in land transaction returns
The Finance (No. 2) Act 2005, Sections 48(1) to (4) (Appointed Day) Order 2009 (S.I. 2009/2094 (C. 155)) was made under section 48(5).

See also
Finance Act

References
Halsbury's Statutes,

External links
The Finance (No. 2) Act 2005, as amended from the National Archives.
The Finance (No. 2) Act 2005, as originally enacted from the National Archives.

United Kingdom Acts of Parliament 2005